Muramba is an Indian Marathi-language television drama series that premiered on 14 February 2022 on Star Pravah. It is also digitally available on Disney+ Hotstar. It stars Shashank Ketkar, Shivani Mundhekar and Nishani Borule. The show is produced by Panorama Entertainment Pvt. Ltd. This show is an official remake of Star Plus's Suhani Si Ek Ladki.

Plot 
It is the story of two best friends who are willing to go to any length for each other. Their friendship takes a new turn when the two pals fall in love with the same guy.

Mahaepisode (1 hour) 
 10 July 2022
 11 September 2022
 2 October 2022
 15 January 2023
 19 February 2023

Cast

Main 
Shashank Ketkar as Lavdya Akshay Mukadam
Shivani Mundhekar as Rama Devsthali
Nishani Borule as Reva Rajadhyaksha

Recurring 
Pratima Kulkarni
Sulekha Talwalkar
Shashwati Pimplikar
Ashish Joshi
Vishwas Navare
Abhijeet Chavan
Swara Korude
Ashutosh Wadekar
Pratik Nikam
Rajashree Parulekar 
Smita Shewale
Shweta Kamat
Vipul Salunkhe
Neha Nimgulkar
Aarush Bankhele

Adaptations

References

External links 
 Muramba at Disney+ Hotstar

Marathi-language television shows
Star Pravah original programming
2022 Indian television series debuts